Dr. (Michael) Bryan Hesford (19 July 1930 - 19 March 1996) was an organist and composer based in England.

Life

He was born on 19 July 1930 in Eccles, Lancashire.

He studied organ under Marcel Dupré and Max Drischner.

Appointments

Assistant organist of Newcastle Cathedral 1959 - 1960
Organist of Wymondham Abbey 1960 - 1963
Organist of Brecon Cathedral 1963 - 1966
Organist of St. Margaret's Priory and Parish Church, King's Lynn 1966 - ????
Organist of St Mary's Church, Melton Mowbray 1973 - 1978
Organist of the Church of St John the Baptist, Frome 1986 
Organist of St. Nicholas' Collegiate Church Galway 1986 - 1995

Compositions

He has composed 3 communion services for Southwark Cathedral, and other music.

References

1930 births
1996 deaths
English organists
British male organists
20th-century classical musicians
20th-century English composers
20th-century organists
20th-century British male musicians